Giovanni Antonio Astorch or Giovanni Antonio Astorco (died 1567) was a Roman Catholic prelate who served as Bishop of Lettere-Gragnano (1565–1567).

Biography
On 7 November 1565, Giovanni Antonio Astorch was appointed during the papacy of Pope Pius IV as Bishop of Lettere-Gragnano.
He served as Bishop of Lettere-Gragnano until his death in 1567. 
While bishop, he was the principal co-consecrator of Felice Peretti Montalto, Bishop of Sant'Agata de' Goti (1567).

References

External links and additional sources
 (for Chronology of Bishops) 
 (for Chronology of Bishops)  

16th-century Italian Roman Catholic bishops
Bishops appointed by Pope Pius IV
1567 deaths